Paul Tirésias Augustin Simon Sam (May 15, 1835 – May 11, 1916) was the President of Haiti from 31 March 1896 to 12 May 1902. He resigned the presidency just before completing his six-year term.

Biography
Born in the year 1835, Tirésias Simon Sam was a well-received politician and he rose to become the country's president in the year 1896. Sam resigned before completion of his presidential term. His political popularity has seen several postage stamps in Haiti bear his likeness. There were reports that Victoire Jean-Baptiste, the president's mistress, had much influence on his leadership.

According to the constitution of Haiti, Sam was elected as the new Haitian President, a week after his predecessor Hyppolite died. Sam was instituted by the National Assembly which held a meeting in Port-au-Prince on 31 March 1896. Before the new position, Sam was the Secretary of War for Haiti. His new term was to run for a period of seven years according to the Haitian constitution.

All the relevant people in governance had accepted the election of the new president. Sam was sworn in on 1 April 1896.

Despite humiliation and pressure from foreign authorities, especially the United States and Germany, Haiti remained calm during the reign of Sam.

Sam's predecessors had majored on infrastructure development, something that Sam embraced. During his governance a new structure to hold the country's Court of Justice was started in Port-au-Prince. New railways were constructed to connect major towns to the Haitian capital. In 1900, Simon Sam's government signed a treaty with France for reciprocity. In 1902 the US also signed a treaty with Haiti on naturalization.

Concerning Sam's term in office, the Haitian General Assembly had misinterpreted the constitution. The issue had been published in local newspapers and was raising concerns. Whereas the National Assembly had declared that Sam was to remain in office until 15 May 1903 this was contrary to the Haitian constitution. According to the Constitution of Haiti, article 93 reads: "In case of the death, resignation, or dismissal of the President, his successor is appointed for seven years, and his power must always cease on 15 May, even if the seventh year of his term be not completed." This article was applicable to the presidential term of Simon Sam. His election was on 31 March 1896 and so he was supposed to leave the presidential seat on 15 May 1902.

Sam wrote a letter of resignation to the Haitian National Assembly on 12 May 1902, three days before the constitutional expiry of his presidential term. He left Port-au-Prince the following day. After Sam's resignation, Haiti was left in the hands of an interim government that was led by General Boisrond Canal, a former head of state of the country. This provisional government was responsible for maintaining law and order before an election of a legal president.

The cousin of Sam, Vilbrun Guillaume Sam, was also a President of Haiti for only five months in 1915. His mistress, Victoire Jean-Baptiste, is said to have had some influence over him.

References

1835 births
1916 deaths
1890s in Haiti
1900s in Haiti
19th-century Haitian politicians
20th-century Haitian politicians
People from Nord (Haitian department)
Presidents of Haiti